Park Avenue Condominiums is a 486 ft (148m) tall skyscraper in Atlanta, Georgia. It was constructed from 1998 to 2000 and has 44 floors. Burt Hill Kosar Rittelmann Associates designed the building, which is the 16th tallest in Atlanta and was the tallest all residential tower until TWELVE Centennial Park passed it in 2007.

See also
List of tallest buildings in Atlanta

References
Emporis
Skyscraperpage
Burt Hill: Architecture Firm

Residential skyscrapers in Atlanta
Residential buildings completed in 2000
Residential condominiums in the United States